Viktor Prokhorovich Yakushev (November 16, 1937 – July 7, 2001) was an ice hockey player who played in the Soviet Hockey League.  He played for Lokomotiv Moscow.  He was inducted into the Russian and Soviet Hockey Hall of Fame in 1963. He was born and died in Moscow.

External links
 Russian and Soviet Hockey Hall of Fame bio

1937 births
2001 deaths
Ice hockey players at the 1960 Winter Olympics
Ice hockey players at the 1964 Winter Olympics
Ice hockey people from Moscow
Olympic medalists in ice hockey
Medalists at the 1960 Winter Olympics
Medalists at the 1964 Winter Olympics
Olympic ice hockey players of the Soviet Union
Olympic bronze medalists for the Soviet Union
Olympic gold medalists for the Soviet Union